The St. James the Apostle Cathedral (also Santiago de los Caballeros Cathedral) is a Catholic church located in the city of Santiago de los Caballeros, the capital of Santiago Province in the Dominican Republic. It was baptized thus in honor of St. James the Greater, the disciple of Jesus, the son of Zebedee and Salome.

It began as a parochial church that was destroyed by an earthquake in 1842. The present structure was built between 1868 and 1894 and consecrated in 1895. It suffered delays in its construction due to lack of funds. It was briefly used as a fortress in the so-called "war of restoration".

The eclectic-style temple follows the Roman or Latin rite and is the mother church of the Archdiocese of Santiago de los Caballeros which was created as a diocese in 1953 by Pope Pius XII by the bull  and elevated to its current status by the bull  of 1994 by Pope John Paul II.

It is under the pastoral responsibility of Archbishop Freddy Antonio de Jesús Bretón Martínez.

See also
Roman Catholicism in the Dominican Republic
St. James the Apostle

References

Roman Catholic cathedrals in the Dominican Republic
Roman Catholic churches completed in 1894
19th-century Roman Catholic church buildings